Drilliola mangaoparia is an extinct species of sea snail, a marine gastropod mollusk in the family Borsoniidae.

Distribution
This fossil species was endemic to New Zealand.

References

 Beu, Alan G. "Descriptions of new species and notes on taxonomy of New Zealand Mollusca." Royal Society of New Zealand, 1970.
 Maxwell, P.A. (2009). Cenozoic Mollusca. pp. 232–254 in Gordon, D.P. (ed.) New Zealand inventory of biodiversity. Volume one. Kingdom Animalia: Radiata, Lophotrochozoa, Deuterostomia. Canterbury University Press, Christchurch.

mangaoparia
Gastropods of New Zealand
Gastropods described in 1970
Extinct animals of New Zealand